The escort aircraft carrier, also called a "jeep carrier" or "baby flattop"  in the USN or "Woolworth Carrier" by the RN, was a small and slow type of aircraft carrier used by the Royal Navy in the Second World War. They were typically half the length and one-third the displacement of the larger fleet carriers. While they were slower, less armed, unarmoured and carried fewer aircraft, they were less expensive and could be built more quickly. This was their principal advantage, as escort carriers could be completed in greater numbers as a stop-gap when fleet carriers were scarce. However, the lack of protection made escort carriers particularly vulnerable and several were sunk with great loss of life. The light carrier (hull classification symbol CVL) was a similar concept to escort carriers in most respects, but they were designed for higher speeds for deployment with fleet carriers.

Escort carriers were too slow to keep up with the main forces consisting of fleet carriers, battleships, and cruisers. Instead, they were used to defend convoys from enemy threats such as submarines and planes. In the invasions of mainland Europe and Pacific islands, escort carriers provided air support to ground forces during amphibious operations. Escort carriers also served as backup aircraft transports for fleet carriers and ferried aircraft of all military services to points of delivery.

In addition, escort carriers such as HMS Vindex and HMS Nairana played an important role in hunter-killer anti-submarine sweeps in company with RN and RCN destroyers, frigates and corvettes (e.g. 6th Canadian Escort Group and 2nd British Escort Group). HMS Vindex is credited with the sinking, or taking part in the sinking, of four U-boats (U344, U653, U765, U394). 

Escort carriers should not be confused with the Merchant Aircraft Carrier or CAM ship.

Key

Audacity

Long Island class

Avenger class

Attacker class

Ruler class

Activity

Nairana class

Pretoria Castle

Notes

R